The Richard Bey Show is a syndicated American talk show hosted by Richard Bey which aired from September 28, 1992 to December 27, 1996. The program was originally produced from and aired on WWOR-TV in Secaucus, New Jersey, from 1992 to late 1996. It was nationally syndicated by All American Television from January 2, 1995 to December 27, 1996. The talk show was executive produced by Bob Woodruff and David Sittenfeld.

Background
The series frequently and deliberately played up the humorous aspects of the tabloid talk show format, bordering on a full-out variety show with its unusual features. It featured such competitive events as the "Miss Big Butt" contest, the "Mr. Puniverse" contest, "Country Drag Queens versus City Drag Queens",  "Dysfunctional Family Feud" and "Blacks who think O.J. is guilty vs. Whites who think he is innocent." Young women who were guests on the show were sometimes placed in a spoof of The Dating Game in which the guest interviewed three hidden "bachelors", all of whom were an obvious mismatch for the "bachelorette" (e.g., a drag queen or a dwarf). Bey's show made frequent use of sound effects like "uh-duh" for an insane response, "I've been framed" for a guest proclaiming innocence and "You're busted!" for one accused of wrongdoing.  Bey would often exclaim "Where do they find these people?!" in the presence of unbelievable guests or audience members.  During some shows, there would be a secret word, and if an audience member used it in a comment, he would receive $100 (an homage to a prior talk and game show, You Bet Your Life). A joking suggestion was then made on how to spend it: "Lobster dinner tonight!"

The show was a precursor to reality television, featuring a variety of games incorporating guests' stories, most notoriously "The Wheel of Torture", in which a guest would be strapped to a spinning wheel while a spouse or lover poured slime on them as punishment for a misdeed.

Richard would frequently make fun of Jerry Springer on his show, as when he lost his contact lenses and was forced to wear eyeglasses, remarking, "Don't worry, you're not watching Jerry Springer" and showing Jerry in his "Bad Neighbors" segment, a reference to Springer's show being the lead-in or lead-out to Bey on many stations in the early-to-mid-1990s. (Springer, in turn, defended himself in 2019 by noting that during the run of his own show, he "wasn't in fights involving Jell-O.") He would also make light of Ricki Lake, Rosie O'Donnell, Phil Donahue, and Oprah Winfrey's shows.

Cancellation
Bey claimed his TV show was cancelled in December 1996 not due to ratings, but as a direct result of doing a program the previous day with Gennifer Flowers, discussing her sexual relationship with then-President Bill Clinton.

References

External links
 

1990s American television talk shows
1992 American television series debuts
1996 American television series endings
First-run syndicated television programs in the United States
Television series by Fremantle (company)